Matsumyia trilineata is a species of hoverfly in the family Syrphidae.

Distribution
Java.

References

Eristalinae
Diptera of Asia
Insects described in 1943
Taxa named by Frank Montgomery Hull